Senoculus darwini is a spider species in the genus Senoculus found in Argentina.

See also
 List of Senoculidae species

References

Araneomorphae
Endemic fauna of Argentina
Spiders of Argentina
Spiders described in 1883
Taxa named by Eduardo Ladislao Holmberg